"Only Human" is a song by Australian singer-songwriter Delta Goodrem. The stripped-back piano ballad was written by Goodrem, Vince Pizzinga and Pete Nappi. It was released as a digital download on 13 March 2015 to coincide with her return to Neighbours for the show's 30th anniversary. Goodrem returned for three episodes and performed "Only Human" on the show as her character Nina Tucker during the episode broadcast on 19 March.

Charts

Release history

References

2015 singles
Delta Goodrem songs
Songs written by Delta Goodrem
Songs written by Vince Pizzinga
2015 songs